Chilson is a hamlet and civil parish in the Evenlode Valley in West Oxfordshire, England, about  south of Chipping Norton. The 2011 Census recorded the parish's population as 141. The toponym, first recorded as Cildestuna in about 1200, is derived from the Old English ċildes tūn, meaning "estate of the young nobleman".

References

Civil parishes in Oxfordshire
Hamlets in Oxfordshire

West Oxfordshire District